Passarelli is an Italian surname. Notable people with the surname include:

Claudio Passarelli (born 1965), German former wrestler 
Diego Passarelli (born 1984), Argentinian Footballer
Eduardo Passarelli (1903–1968), Italian film actor
Kenny Passarelli (born 1949), American bass guitarist
Pasquale Passarelli (born 1957), retired Italian-born German wrestler

Fictional characters:
Eddie Passarelli of Third and Indiana

Italian-language surnames